James Ryan (born 6 September 1988) is an Irish professional footballer who is a free agent and has played for the Republic of Ireland Under-21 as a midfielder.

Career
Ryan began his career with Liverpool, and was part of their FA Youth Cup winning teams of 2006 and 2007. He plays for Republic of Ireland at youth level. He is known for his shots from distance, which accounted for most of his goals in the two FA Youth Cup runs.

It was announced on 14 August 2007, that Ryan was to join League Two side Shrewsbury Town on a month's loan. He made his debut for Shrewsbury on 14 August 2007, playing the full 120 minutes of the 1–0 win over Colchester United in the League Cup. In October, a permanent deal was agreed, effective from 1 January 2008. In the interim period, Ryan was still technically a loan player, but was unable to play for Shrewsbury between 26 November and 1 January, due to a 93-day restriction on short-term loans. He made a total of seven appearances, before being released by the club on 29 April 2008.

In August 2008, Ryan signed for Accrington Stanley, following a trial. He scored his first goal for the Republic of Ireland U21 in Lithuania in October 2008. After his performances for Accrington Stanley throughout the 2010–11 League Two season he was voted in the PFA Team of the Year. On 28 June 2011 he signed a two-year contract with League One side Scunthorpe United. On 5 June 2013 Ryan signed a one-year contract with League Two side Chesterfield.
On 1 July 2015, Ryan signed for Fleetwood Town on a free transfer. After 67 appearances and winning the club's Player of the Year in 2016, Ryan penned a two-year deal with Blackpool.

On 29 July 2019, Ryan signed a two-year deal with Rochdale.

Career statistics

Honours
Liverpool Youth
FA Youth Cup: 2005–06, 2006–07

Chesterfield
 Football League Two: 2013–14
 Football League Trophy: runner-up 2013–14

Individual
PFA Team of the Year: 2010–11 Football League Two

References

External links

1988 births
Living people
Republic of Ireland association footballers
Republic of Ireland under-21 international footballers
Association football midfielders
Liverpool F.C. players
Shrewsbury Town F.C. players
Accrington Stanley F.C. players
Scunthorpe United F.C. players
Chesterfield F.C. players
Fleetwood Town F.C. players
Blackpool F.C. players
Rochdale A.F.C. players
English Football League players

ru:Райан, Джимми